María Bertha Espinoza Segura (15 November 1957 – 13 September 2022) was a Mexican politician. A member of Morena, she served in the Chamber of Deputies from 2018 to 2022.

Espinoza died of cancer in Mexico City on 13 September 2022, at the age of 64.

References

1957 births
2022 deaths
Morena (political party) politicians
21st-century Mexican politicians
Deputies of the LXIV Legislature of Mexico
Deputies of the LXV Legislature of Mexico
Politicians from Veracruz
Deaths from cancer in Mexico